Barbora Piešová (born 26 June 2000) is a Slovak singer who won 6th season of the Czech&Slovak SuperStar, a local itineration of the Idol franchise singing competition. She finished third in the 2021 edition of the show Tvoja tvár znie povedome.

Early career 
Piešová grew up in the village Poruba, nearby the town of Prievidza. She was the youngest out of four sisters. Her sister Lenka is also a singer and competed in the show Česko Slovensko má talent in 2010. Lenka's example served as an inspiration for Barbora to pick up singing.

From the early age Piešová  participated in singing competitions in Slovakia and Czechia. In 2019, she graduated from High School and started working in a local window making factory in Prievidza. She also started uploading her songs on YouTube, receiving a large number of views.

SuperStar and beyond 
In 2020 Piešová competed in the 6th season of the Czech&Slovak SuperStar. At the initial casting she sang Next to Me by Imagine Dragons. After advancing through several selection rounds with her performances of Runaway Baby by Bruno Mars, Come Together by the Beatles as well as V slepých uličkách by Marika Gombitová and Miroslav Žbirka, she advanced to semi-finals. At the semi-finals, she sang I will survive by Gloria Gaynor and advanced to the final rounds.

Due to the COVID-19 pandemic there were only two final rounds instead of originally planned five. In the first round Piešová sang Somebody to Love by the Queen. In the super-finals on 31 March 2020 she sang I’m So Excited by The Pointer Sisters and Richarda Müllera's song Milovanie v daždi. Finally, she performed Next to Me again. In the end, she won the competition by receiving 32.5% of the votes.

In June 2020 Warner Music released a compilation of Piešová songs from the show under the tile Barbora Piešová: Superstar. On 30 October 2020, Piešová released her debut album Som flegmatik, ale optimista.

In January 2021 Piešová  competed in the reality showTvoja tvár znie povedome, performing Queen of the Night by Whitney Houston. She finished third in the competition.

References 

2000 births
Living people
People from Prievidza District
21st-century Slovak women singers